Rain (also: Rain (Lech)) is a town in the Donau-Ries district, in Bavaria, Germany. It is situated on the river Lech, close to its confluence with the Danube, 11 km east of Donauwörth.

Rain is on the B16 road and served by the Ingolstadt–Neuoffingen railway (part of the Danube Valley Railway—Donautalbahn), both of which run between Ulm and Regensburg.

The earliest reference to Rain is in a document of the Niederschönenfeld monastery dated 4 July 1257, wherein it is described as a "civitas nostra" or ducal town. It is most probable that Rain was founded during the reign of Otto II Wittelsbach, Duke of Bavaria (1248–1253) or at the latest in the reign of Louis II, Duke of Bavaria (1253–1294) before 1257.

Rain was founded for economic and strategic reasons. The town protected Bavaria from the northwest and collected customs from its bridge over the river Lech.

On 15 April 1632, during the Thirty Years War, the Battle of Rain took place. The Protestant army of Gustavus Adolphus of Sweden defeated the army of the Catholic League commanded by Johann Tserclaes von Tilly. Tilly withdrew his troops to Ingolstadt, where he died from tetanus from an infected gunshot wound in his thigh.

In 1914 a monument commemorating Tilly was erected in front of Rain's Rococo town hall. Rain's architectural heritage also includes the Roman Catholic parish church of St John the Baptist, which features late Gothic frescoes dating from about 1480. There is also the Swabian Gate, the historic Spital with its All Saints' chapel and the former Castle.

Rain has three museums: the Lachner Brothers Museum, Homeland Museum and Jean-Duprai-Museum. The four Lachner brothers, Theodor, Franz, Ignaz and Vinzenz, were nineteenth-century German composers, all of whom were born in the town.

Other historic figures from Rain include lawyer and astronomer Johann Bayer (1562–1625), humanist Georg Tannstetter (1482–1535) and pianist Michael Raucheisen (1889–1984).

Rain is the headquarters of the Dehner chain of garden centres, which employs 1,100 people in the town. Rain's other industries include a sugar refinery employing 240-280 people.

Rain is twinned with Tougan, capital of the province of Sourou in Burkina Faso.

Mayors 
Otto Spreitler, temporary (1945)
Josef Müller (1945–1948)
Carl Faig (1948–1966)
Karl Würmseher, PWG (1966–1990)
Gerhard Martin, SPD (1990-2020)
Karl Rehm, PWG (since 2020)

Other people 

 Georg Tannstetter, called  Collimitius  (1482–1535), scholar and humanist
  Johannes Bayer (1572–1625), jurist and creator of the Uranometria
 Franz Lachner (1803–1890), musician
 Ignaz Lachner (1807–1895), musician
 Vinzenz Lachner (1811–1893), musician
 Michael Raucheisen (1889–1984), pianist and composer
 Georg Weber (1910–1986), entrepreneur
 Dieter Reiter (born 1958), politician (SPD), Mayor of Munich since May 2014

References

Donau-Ries